Qarah Hasan (also Romanized as Qarah Ḩasan) is a village in Poshtdarband Rural District, in the Central District of Kermanshah County, Kermanshah Province, Iran. At the 2006 census, its population was 326, in 72 families.

References 

Populated places in Kermanshah County